The qualifying for the 2016 Men's World Floorball Championships took place between 2 and 14 February 2016. A total of 33 teams competed for fifteen spots. The final tournament was organized by Latvia in December 2016.

Overview
Numbers in brackets show the ranking before the qualification started, which is based on results from the last two World Championships.

Europe
The qualification rules are as follows:
 The two best teams from each qualification group will qualify
 The two best third placed teams will qualify
 The calculation of the best 3rd teams will follow this order:
 1. Average number of points 
 2. Average goal difference 
 3. Average scored goals
 4. Drawing of lots

European Qualification 1
Dates: 3 – 7 February 2016
Venue: Arena Klokocina, Nitra, Slovakia

European Qualification 2
Dates: 3 – 7 February 2016
Venue: TTÜ Sports Hall, Tallinn, Estonia

European Qualification 3
Dates: 3 – 7 February 2016
Venue: Arena Lochow, Lochow, Poland

European Qualification 4
Dates: 2 – 6 February 2016
Venue: Sports Hall Poden, Skofja Loka, Slovenia

Ranking of third-placed teams
Since the number of teams between the qualification groups differ, the group sizes were equalised by removing the results from the matches against the lowest placed teams in the larger-sized group before comparing the average results.

Asia–Oceania
The qualification rules are as follows:
 The three best teams will qualify
Dates: 2 – 6 February 2016
Venue: Pattaya Sports Indoor Stadium, Pattaya, Thailand

Group A

Group B

Play-off

5th–7th-place play-off

6th-place play-off

Semi-finals

Bronze medal game

Final

Final ranking
{| class="wikitable"
!Rank
!Team
|-bgcolor=BBF3BB
|align=center|||
|-bgcolor=BBF3BB
|align=center|||
|-bgcolor=BBF3BB
|align=center|||
|-
|align=center|4||
|-
|align=center|5||
|-
|align=center|6||
|-
|align=center|7||
|}

Americas
The qualification rules are as follows:
 The two best teams from the qualification group will qualify
Dates: 12 – 14 February 2016
Venue: Olympic Training Center, Colorado Springs, United States

References

2016, Men's Qualifying
Men's World Floorball Championships qualifying
Men's World Floorball Championships qualifying
Men's World Floorball Championships qualifying
Men's World Floorball Championships qualifying
Men's World Floorball Championships qualifying
Men's World Floorball Championships qualifying
2016 in floorball